The Bătrâneanca is a right tributary of the river Stâmnic in Romania. It flows into the Stâmnic in Cătina.

References

 Starchiojd 

Rivers of Romania
Rivers of Prahova County